Freddie Gilbert (born April 8, 1962) is a former American football player who played defensive end for three seasons with the Denver Broncos in the NFL. Born in Griffin, Georgia, Gilbert attended Griffin High School and then went on to play for the Georgia Bulldogs. Gilbert was drafted by the Broncos in the first round of the 1984 Supplemental Draft, but opted to play his first two years professionally with the New Jersey Generals of the USFL. He joined the Broncos for the 1986 season and played in Super Bowl XXI and Super Bowl XXII. Gilbert finished his career with the Phoenix Cardinals in 1989. He resides in Athens, Georgia.

References

1962 births
Living people
Players of American football from Chicago
American football defensive ends
Georgia Bulldogs football players
Denver Broncos players
Phoenix Cardinals players
New Jersey Generals players